Coyote (fem. Coyota) (from the Nahuatl word coyotl, coyote) is a colonial Spanish American racial term for a mixed-race person casta that usually refers to a person born of parents, one of whom a Mestizo (mixed Spanish + Indigenous) and the other indigenous (indio).

Representation
The casta paintings by Miguel Cabrera (1763) show the place of the coyote in the idealized colonial racial hierarchy (sistema de castas).  In colonial Mexico, the term varied regionally, with "regional differences determin[ing] just how much native ancestry qualified a person to be a coyote."

See also
Casta
Cholo

References

Further reading
Katzew, Ilona. Casta Painting: Images of Race in Eighteenth-Century Mexico. New Haven: Yale University Press 2004.

Latin American caste system
Race (human categorization)